Idle Running is a 1999 Slovene comedy film directed by Janez Burger.

References

External links 

1999 comedy films
1999 films
Slovenian comedy films
Slovene-language films